Rupperswil railway station is a railway station in the municipality of Rupperswil, in the Swiss canton of Aargau. It is an intermediate stop on the Baden–Aarau and Heitersberg lines and the northern terminus of the Rupperswil–Immensee line.

Services 
The following services stop at Rupperswil:

 Aargau S-Bahn:
 : hourly service between Langenthal and Baden.
 : half-hourly service between Aarau and Turgi, with every other train continuing from Aarau to Sursee.

References

External links 
 
 

Railway stations in the canton of Aargau
Swiss Federal Railways stations